Howard F. Pellant (July 23, 1911 – November 22, 1977) was a member of the Wisconsin State Assembly.

Biography
Pellant was born on July 23, 1911 in Milwaukee, Wisconsin, son of George Pellant and Elizabeth Gough. He married Mary Kazmierczak in 1932. Pellant died 22 November 1977 in Milwaukee WI. He was a member of the Fraternal Order of Eagles and the Loyal Order of Moose.

Career
Pellant was elected to the Assembly in 1952. Additionally, he was a delegate to the 1952 Democratic National Convention.

References

Politicians from Milwaukee
Democratic Party members of the Wisconsin State Assembly
1911 births
1977 deaths
20th-century American politicians